Mustapha Kouchene (born 14 February 1962) is an Algerian boxer. He competed in the men's bantamweight event at the 1984 Summer Olympics. At the 1984 Summer Olympics, he lost to Dale Walters of Canada.

References

External links
 

1962 births
Living people
Algerian male boxers
Olympic boxers of Algeria
Boxers at the 1984 Summer Olympics
Place of birth missing (living people)
Bantamweight boxers
21st-century Algerian people
20th-century Algerian people